Volusia Saturnina also known from her funeral inscription as Volusia Latina Saturnina was a Roman noble woman who lived in the Roman Empire in the second half of the 1st century BC and first half of the first century AD.

Family background
Saturnina came from an ancient and distinguished Senatorial family, that never rose above the Praetorship which was of eques status.

She was the daughter of the suffect consul Lucius Volusius Saturninus by his wife Nonia Polla. Volusia Saturnina was a first cousin once removed to Roman emperor Tiberius and his brother, the General Nero Claudius Drusus. Her brother was the suffect consul Lucius Volusius Saturninus.

Marriage and issue
Saturnina married Marcus Lollius, the son of the consul and military leader Marcus Lollius and his wife Aurelia. Aurelia was a sister to the Roman Senator Marcus Aurelius Cotta Maximus Messalinus.

Saturnina and Lollius had two daughters:

 Lollia Saturnina
 Lollia Paulina

References

Sources
Tacitus - The Annals of Imperial Rome
G. Rickman, Roman Granaries and Store Buildings, CUP Archive, 1971
M. Hainzmann & P. Schubert, Corpus inscriptionum Latinarum, Walter de Gruyter, 1987
Lollia Gens article at ancient library
Marcus Lollius no. 5 article at ancient library
Quintus Volusius no.2 article at ancient library
Romeins Imperium – Lucius Quintus Volusius Saturninus translated from Dutch to English
Genealogy of Volusius Saturninus by D.C. O’Driscoll
Marcus Lollius’ article at Livius.org

1st-century BC Romans
1st-century Romans
1st-century BC Roman women
Saturnina